Gharibjanyan,  known as Aleksandrovka until 1935, is a village in the Akhuryan Municipality of the Shirak Province of Armenia. The village was renamed in 1935 in honor of Bolshevik leader Bagrat Gharibjanyan, killed in 1920.

Demographics
The population of the village since 1908 is as follows:<

References 

Populated places in Shirak Province